Martina Dubovská (born 27 February 1992) is a Czech alpine skier. She competed at the 2014 and 2018 Winter Olympics.

World Cup results

Season standings

World Championship results

Olympic results

References

External links

 

1992 births
Living people
Czech female alpine skiers
Alpine skiers at the 2014 Winter Olympics
Alpine skiers at the 2018 Winter Olympics
Alpine skiers at the 2022 Winter Olympics
Olympic alpine skiers of the Czech Republic
Universiade medalists in alpine skiing
Sportspeople from Třinec
Universiade gold medalists for the Czech Republic
Competitors at the 2013 Winter Universiade
Competitors at the 2017 Winter Universiade